In molecular biology, NPPA antisense RNA 1 (non-protein coding), also known as NPPA-AS1 is a long non-coding RNA. It is an antisense transcript of the NPPA gene, which encodes the precursor of cardiodilatin-related peptide and atrial natriuretic factor. NPPA-AS1 is alternatively spliced. At least one isoform of NPPA-AS1 can regulate the expression of spliced and unspliced variants of NPPA, possibly by the formation of duplexes with NPPA mRNA.

See also
 Long noncoding RNA

References

Non-coding RNA